The 2018 wildfire season in Montana began around June, 2018.

It was spotted on July 19. Firefighters needed to wear respirators to protect themselves from exposure to asbestos mixed with duff and bark by mining operations and mobilized by the fire.

References

 
Wildfires
Wildfires in Montana
Lincoln County, Montana